John Firth may refer to:

 John Firth (cricketer) (1900–1957), schoolboy cricketer and Church of England clergyman
 John Firth (folklorist) (1838–1922), Scottish folklorist
 John Rupert Firth (1890–1960), commonly known as J. R. Firth, English linguist
 John Firth (baseball) (1855–1902), baseball player
 John C. B. Firth (1894–1931), World War I flying ace